The LIU Sharks women's ice hockey team represents Long Island University in NCAA Division I ice hockey competition as a member of the New England Women's Hockey Alliance (NEWHA). They play their home games at Islanders Iceworks in Syosset, New York and Northwell Health Ice Center in East Meadow, New York.

History
Long Island University announced the addition of women's ice hockey as a varsity sport in September 2018 along with the naming of Rob Morgan as the inaugural head coach.
 Soon after, the university announced a consolidation of the LIU Post Pioneers with the LIU Brooklyn Blackbirds to form one Division I athletic program at the university's Brooklyn campus. The current LIU program now competes as the LIU Sharks, with the new nickname having been selected by polling of alumni and students of the two campuses.

On September 26, 2018, LIU joined Division I Sacred Heart as well as Division II programs Franklin Pierce University, Post University, Saint Anselm College, and Saint Michael's College in the formation of the NEWHA conference. LIU becoming the sixth member of the organization allowed the NEWHA to transition from a scheduling affiliation to an NCAA hockey-only conference eligible for an autobid to the NCAA women's ice hockey tournament.

The team began competition in September 2019 to become the first, and only, women's NCAA ice hockey team on Long Island with 21 freshmen, one sophomore, and one junior. The Sharks played in their first exhibition game against the Metropolitan Riveters of the National Women's Hockey League on September 28. LIU's officially opened their inaugural season with the team's first NCAA games on October 4 and 5 versus the UConn Huskies, losing both contests by scores of 0-4 and 1–6. On October 19, 2019, LIU hosted top-ranked Wisconsin at Nassau Coliseum. LIU recorded its first victory on November 1, 2019 on the road at Saint Michael's with a 5–2 win; the game was also the Sharks' first conference game of the inaugural season. The Sharks finished the regular season 4th in the NEWHA with an 11–10–0 conference record.  The Sharks upset top-seeded Sacred Heart in the semifinal round of the conference championship with a 3–0 win. In the NEWHA Championship game, the Sharks faced Saint Anselm in the Championship game after the Hawks defeated Franklin Pierce in a record-breaking five-overtime game. The Sharks scored the lone goal of the contest in the 2nd period then held on for 1–0 victory to earn the program's first conference tournament championship.

During the 2022–23 season, LIU posted an overall record of 20–13–3 and finished first in the conference with a record of 17–4–3. They won the NEWHA tournament to receive their first bid to the NCAA women's ice hockey tournament.

Season by season results

See also
LIU Sharks men's ice hockey

References

External links
 Official website

 
LIU Sharks
College women's ice hockey teams in the United States
Ice hockey teams in New York (state)
New England Women's Hockey Alliance